The 2005 Polish Speedway season was the 2005 season of motorcycle speedway in Poland.

Individual

Polish Individual Speedway Championship
The 2005 Individual Speedway Polish Championship final was held on 15 August at Tarnów.

Golden Helmet
The 2005 Golden Golden Helmet organised by the Polish Motor Union (PZM) was the 2005 event for the league's leading riders. The final was held on the 14 October at Rybnik.

Junior Championship
 winner - Adrian Miedziński

Silver Helmet
 winner - Janusz Kołodziej

Bronze Helmet
 winner - Patryk Pawlaszczyk

Pairs

Polish Pairs Speedway Championship
The 2005 Polish Pairs Speedway Championship was the 2005 edition of the Polish Pairs Speedway Championship. The final was held on 18 September at Wrocław.

Team

Team Speedway Polish Championship
The 2005 Team Speedway Polish Championship was the 2005 edition of the Team Polish Championship. Unia Tarnów won the gold medal for the second consecutive season.

Ekstraliga

Play offs
quarter finals
Tarnów - Wrocław 64–25, 45-45
Leszno - Częstochowa 46–44, 35-55
Zielona Góra - Gdańsk 45-45, 31-59
Wrocław - Leszno 49–41, 39,51
semi finals
Częstochowa - Bydgoszcz 47–42, 29-61
Tarnów - Toruń 62–28, 42-48
final
Częstochowa - Tarnów 58–56, 43-46

1.Liga

Play offs	
								
Lublin - Rzeszów 42–48, 28-62	
Grudziądz - Ostrów Wlkp. 48–42, 37-53
quarter finals
Ostrów Wlkp. - Gorzów Wlkp. 50–40, 48-42
Rzeszów - Rybnik 57–33, 46-44
semi finals									
Rybnik - Gorzów Wlkp. 52-37									
Gorzów Wlkp. - Rybnik 39-50 (102-76)
final								
Ostrów Wlkp. - Rzeszów 47-43 32-57

2.Liga

+withdrew

Play-offs																	
Równe - Piła (115:64)									
Rawicz - Łódź (86:94)																	
Gniezno - Łódź (107:64)								
Daugavpils - Równe (77:103)																							
final						
Gniezno - Równe (103:77)

References

Poland Individual
Poland Team
Speedway
2005 in Polish speedway